Tellurium dioxide (TeO2) is a solid oxide of tellurium. It is encountered in two different forms, the yellow orthorhombic mineral tellurite, β-TeO2, and the synthetic, colourless tetragonal (paratellurite), α-TeO2.  Most of the information regarding reaction chemistry has been obtained in studies involving paratellurite,  α-TeO2.

Preparation
Paratellurite, α-TeO2, is produced by reacting tellurium with O2:

Te + O2 → TeO2

An alternative preparation is to dehydrate tellurous acid, H2TeO3, or to thermally decompose basic tellurium nitrate, Te2O4·HNO3, above 400 °C.

Physical properties

Chemical properties
TeO2 is barely soluble in water and soluble in strong acids and alkali metal hydroxides. It is an amphoteric substance and therefore can act both as an acid or as a base depending on the solution it is in. It reacts with acids to make tellurium salts and bases to make tellurites. It can be oxidized to telluric acid or tellurates.

Structure
Paratellurite, α-TeO2, converts at high pressure into the β-, tellurite form. Both the α-, (paratellurite) and β- (tellurite forms) contain four coordinate Te with the oxygen atoms at four of the corners of a trigonal bipyramid. In paratellurite all vertices are shared to give a rutile-like structure, where the O-Te-O bond angle are 140°. α-TeO2 In tellurite pairs of trigonal pyramidal, TeO4 units, sharing an edge, share vertices to then form a layer. The shortest Te-Te distance in tellurite is 317 pm, compared to 374 pm in paratellurite. Similar Te2O6 units are found in the mineral denningite.

 melts at 732.6 °C, forming a red liquid.  The structure of the liquid, as well as the glass which can be formed from it with sufficiently rapid cooling, are also based on approximately four coordinate Te. However, compared to the crystalline forms, the liquid and glass appear to incorporate short-range disorder (a variety of coordination geometries) which marks TeO2 glass as distinct from the canonical single-oxide glass-formers such as SiO2, which share the same short-range order with their parent liquids.

Uses
It is used as an acousto-optic material.

Tellurium dioxide is also a reluctant glass former, it will form a glass under suitable cooling conditions, or with small molar% additions of a second compound such as an oxide or halide. TeO2 glasses have high refractive indices and transmit into the mid-infrared part of the electromagnetic spectrum, therefore they are of technological interest for optical waveguides. Tellurite glasses have also been shown to exhibit Raman gain up to 30 times that of silica, useful in optical fibre amplification.

Safety
TeO2 is a possible teratogen.

Exposure to tellurium compounds produces a garlic-like odour on the breath, caused by the formation of ethyl telluride.

References

External links
TeO2 properties at Moltech Berlin
Safety data for TeO2

Oxides
Tellurium(IV) compounds
Nonlinear optical materials
Interchalcogens